Helidon railway station is located on the Main line in Queensland, Australia. It serves the town of Helidon in the Lockyer Valley Region. The station has one platform with a passing loop, opening in 1866.

History 
An 1891 Railway Tourist Guide says this of Helidon Station:

"Thence across open forest flats and rolling ridges with red box gums , silver leaf ironbark, and apple tree ; ranges showing in the background to the north and south, until the arrival at Helidon, 72 miles from Brisbane at 462 feet altitude. Here is a well-appointed refreshment room where the traveler can obtain a regular lunch, or sandwiches, tea, coffee, milk or any hotel beverage at the bar. Two miles from here is the Helidon Spa water spring"

Services
It is also a timetabled stop for Queensland Rail Travel's twice weekly Westlander services:

 3S86 (Roma Street - Charleville) stops here on Tuesdays and Thursdays
 3987 (Charleville - Roma Street) stops here on Thursdays and Saturdays

References

External links

Helidon station Queensland's Railways on the Internet

Helidon, Queensland
Railway stations in Australia opened in 1866
Railway stations in Lockyer Valley Region
Main Line railway, Queensland